The  Chicago Rush season was the 10th season for the franchise in the Arena Football League. The team was coached by Bob McMillen and played their home games at Allstate Arena. The Rush finished the regular season 13–5, qualifying for the playoffs for the 10th consecutive season. As the 2nd seed, they defeated the Dallas Vigilantes 54–41 in the conference semifinals before losing to the Arizona Rattlers 48–54 in the conference championship.

Standings

Schedule

Regular season
The Rush began the season on the road against the Milwaukee Iron on March 14. Their home opener was on March 18 as they hosted the Philadelphia Soul. In their final regular season game, they played Milwaukee at home.

Playoffs

Regular season

Week 1: at Milwaukee Mustangs

Week 2: vs. Philadelphia Soul

Week 3: vs. San Jose SaberCats

Week 4: at Cleveland Gladiators

Week 5: BYE

Week 6: at Iowa Barnstormers

Week 7: vs. Kansas City Command

Week 8: vs. New Orleans VooDoo

Week 9: at Tulsa Talons

Week 10: at Arizona Rattlers

Week 11: vs. Dallas Vigilantes

Week 12: vs. Tulsa Talons

Week 13: at Kansas City Command

Week 14: BYE

Week 15: at Spokane Shock

Week 16: vs. Iowa Barnstormers

Week 17: vs. Utah Blaze

Week 18: at Georgia Force

Week 19: at Dallas Vigilantes

Week 20: vs. Milwaukee Mustangs

Playoffs

National Conference Semifinals: vs. (3) Dallas Vigilantes

National Conference Championship: at (1) Arizona Rattlers

References

Chicago Rush
Chicago Rush seasons
Chicago